Ansonia may refer to:

Places
 Ansonia, Ontario, Canada
 Ansonia, Connecticut, U.S.
 Ansonia High School (Connecticut)
 Ansonia station
 Ansonia, Ohio, U.S.
 Ansonia High School (Ohio)
 Ansonia, Pennsylvania, U.S.

Other uses
 Ansonia (frog), a genus of poisonous toads
 The Ansonia, a luxury residence on the Upper West Side of Manhattan
 Ansonia Clock Company